Yorkshire is a historic county in England.

Yorkshire may also refer to:
Yorkshire dialect

Place-names of England derived from the historic shire name
East Riding of Yorkshire, a traditional division of the British county and the name of a unitary authority in England since 1996
East Yorkshire (district), a local government district in England between 1974 and 1996
North Riding of Yorkshire, a traditional division of the British county and an administrative county in England between 1889 and 1974
North Yorkshire, a non-metropolitan county and (larger) ceremonial county in England since 1974
West Riding of Yorkshire, a traditional division of the British county and an administrative county in England between 1889 and 1974
South Yorkshire, a metropolitan county in England since 1974
West Yorkshire, a metropolitan county in England since 1974
Yorkshire (UK Parliament constituency) (1290-1832)
Yorkshire and the Humber, government office region of England, created in 1994 as Yorkshire and Humberside
Yorkshire and the Humber (European Parliament constituency), created in 1999

United States
Yorkshire (CDP), New York
Yorkshire (town), New York
York Shire (Province of New York)
Yorkshire, Ohio
Yorkshire, Virginia

Other uses
Yorkshire Building Society, a UK financial institution
Yorkshire County Cricket Club, a first class county cricket club
Yorkshire pudding, a traditional type of food in England
Yorkshire Square, a fermentation system for beer
ITV Yorkshire, a television company in England
Yorkshire Terrier, a breed of dog
Yorkshire Ripper, a British mass murderer
Yorkshire Tiger, a former bus company now known as Team Pennine

See also
 Yorkshire Cup (disambiguation)
Yorkshire Dales
Yorkshire Day
Yorkshire Wolds